Banu Lam is an Arab tribe of central Arabia and southern Iraq.  The tribe claims descent from the ancient Arab tribe of Tayy. It dominated western Nejd (the region between Medina and al-Yamama) before the 15th century. The tribe split into three main bedouin (nomadic) groups: the Fudhool, the Al Kathir, and the Al Mughira. Many clans from Bani Lam, however, remained in Nejd as settled townspeople.

References

 

Tribes of Iraq
Tribes of Arabia
Ethnic groups in Iran
Tayy